Wang Ying (born December 31, 1968) is a Chinese softball player who competed in the 1996 and 2000 Summer Olympics.

In 1996 she won the silver medal as part of the Chinese team. She played all ten matches.

In the 2000 Olympic softball competition Wang finished fourth with the Chinese team. She played all eight matches.

External links
Profile at databaseolympics.com (archive)

1968 births
Living people
Chinese softball players
Olympic softball players of China
Softball players at the 1996 Summer Olympics
Softball players at the 2000 Summer Olympics
Olympic silver medalists for China
Olympic medalists in softball
Medalists at the 1996 Summer Olympics
Asian Games medalists in softball
Softball players at the 1990 Asian Games
Softball players at the 1994 Asian Games
Softball players at the 1998 Asian Games
Medalists at the 1990 Asian Games
Medalists at the 1994 Asian Games
Medalists at the 1998 Asian Games
Asian Games gold medalists for China